The Lighthouse of Ponta Negra is a beacon/lighthouse located along the cliffs of promontory of Ponta Negra, in the municipality of Vila do Corvo, on the Portuguese island of Corvo, in the archipelago of the Azores.

History

In 1955, construction began on a modernization of the light. By May 1956, the new light was inaugurated, this time using a fourth-order dioptric light, in groups of double clarions, with a  range.

Its power source was changed in February 1987, to photovoltaic panels, and converted to a solar panel-battery reserve system by the first decade of the 21st century.

Architecture
This light is located on the clifftop promontory of Ponta Negra, on the southern coast of Corvo (west of the port of Boqueirão) alongside the traditional windmills; it is at the edge of the Caminho dos Moinhos near the westernmost windmill of the group.

The modern building consists of a beacon mounted to a hexagonal tower, constructed of reinforced concrete.

See also

 List of lighthouses in Portugal

References

Notes

Sources

External links
 Picture of Lighthouse of Ponta Negra

Lighthouses completed in 1910
Ponta Negra
Buildings and structures in Vila do Corvo